Dornberger (Dørnberger is  a Norwegian spelling) is a German-language surname. Notable people with the surname include:

 Carl Dørnberger (1864–1940), Norwegian artist
 Walter Dornberger (1895–1980), German Army artillery officer

German-language surnames
Norwegian-language surnames